It's a Man's Man's World is the second studio album by Australian  soul/R & B singer Renée Geyer. The album was released in August 1974 and peaked at number 28 on the Kent Music Report.

Track listing
Vinyl/ cassette (MVPL1-0024G)
Side one
 "It's a Man's Man's World" (James Brown) - 3.42
 "They Tell Me of an Unclouded Day" (Jackie Moore, Dave Crawford, Brad Shapiro) - 3.42
 "Take Me Where You Took Me Last Night" (Dee Ervin, Lynne Farr) - 3.53
 "Since I Fell for You" (Buddy Johnson) - 3.42
 "What Do I Do on Sunday Morning?" (Dennis Lambert, Brian Potter) - 3.58
 "Love the Way You Love" (Mark Punch, Garry Paige) - 3:08
 "Scarlet Ribbons"  (Evelyn Danzig, Jack Segal) - 2.45
Side Two
 "Do Your Thing" (Isaac Hayes) - 3.44
 "And I Love Him" (John Lennon, Paul McCartney) - 5.14
 "It's Been a Long Time" (Melvin Wilson, James Baker) - 3.23 
 "Mama's Little Girl" (Dennis Lambert, Brian Potter) - 3.26
 "Once in a Lifetime Thing" (Jim Weatherly)  - 3.33
 "Feel Good" (Alan Ciner) - 3.15

Personnel
Renée Geyer - vocals, backing vocals
Phil Manning - guitars
Tim Gaze - guitars
Steve Murphy - guitars
Tony Naylor - guitars
Tweed Harris - keyboards
Barry "Big Goose" Sullivan - bass guitar
Mike Kelly - bass guitar
Geoff Cox - drums
Julie McKenna, Wendy Reece, Bobby Bright, Mike Brady - background vocals
Gary Hyde - percussion

Charts

References

1974 albums
Renée Geyer albums
RCA Records albums